Sharon Fichman (born December 3, 1990) is a Canadian-Israeli inactive tennis player.

In 2004, at the age of 13, she was Canada's Under-18 Indoor & Outdoor National girls' champion, and also won the doubles title. In 2005, Fichman won the gold medal in women's singles at the 2005 Maccabiah Games in Israel, at the age of 14. In 2006, Fichman won the Australian Open and French Open junior doubles championships. She was ranked No. 5 on the ITF Junior Circuit in December 2006. Since turning professional, her career-highs have been No. 77 in singles (May 19, 2014) and No. 21 in doubles (January 17, 2022).

She was inactive from May 2016 to April 2018, but returned to tennis in doubles at the $60k event in Indian Harbour Beach, reaching the quarterfinals with Jamie Loeb. She competed at last at the 2021 WTA Finals.

Personal life
Fichman, who is Jewish, was born and raised in Forest Hill in Toronto, Canada. She is a citizen of both Canada and Israel. Her parents, Julia and Bobby, emigrated from Romania to Israel in 1982, and then to Canada in 1989. Bobby was a semi-pro tennis player, and is now a nuclear engineer. Her mother is a computer engineer and also a tennis fan.

Fichman started playing tennis at the age of four, and won her first tournament at six. By age 13, she was the world No. 2 player under-14. In 2004, at the age of 13, she was Canada's Under-18 Indoor & Outdoor National girls champion, and also won the doubles title with partner Mélanie Gloria. In 2006, Fichman and Anastasia Pavlyuchenkova dominated doubles at the Grand Slam juniors by winning the Australian Open and French Open. At the 2006 Juniors US Open, Fichman quartered in singles and came close to capturing her third Grand Slam title in doubles with a finalist showing. She lost in the finals of the Canadian Open Junior Championship in both singles and doubles. She attended Forest Hill Collegiate Institute, a public high school, which she graduated from in July 2008.

Fichman's idol is Belgian Justine Henin. She is engaged to retired figure skater Dylan Moscovitch.

Tennis career

2005
In 2005, Fichman won the gold medal in women's singles at the 2005 Maccabiah Games in Israel, at the age of 14. She defeated Israeli Julia Glushko in the semi-finals. She defeated 23-year-old Nicole Ptak of the United States in straight sets in the final. "I represented my religion and my country", she said after beating Ptak. "These Games are not just all about sports but meeting people, learning about culture and building friendship. Being the No. 1 Jewish female tennis player in the world is also not too shabby." Fichman also won a bronze medal in the women's doubles, and wrapped up the event with silver medal in mixed doubles. She was also Canada's flag-bearer at the Games.

2006–10
In October 2006, while still 15, she beat world No. 114, Hana Šromová. In August 2007, at the age of 16, Fichman beat world No. 90, Stéphanie Cohen-Aloro of France in Toronto. She finished 2007 with a singles record for the year of 16–8. In October 2008, 17 years of age, Fichman beat world No. 137, Jelena Pandžić. She finished 2008 with a singles record for the year of 25–16. In January 2009, she won the singles title at the Ace Sports Group Tennis Classic tournament in Lutz, Florida dropping only one set, and also won the doubles title with Kimberly Couts.

In April 2009, she won the Osprey, Florida tournament. Fichman reached the $100k Biella Challenger singles final in September 2009, but lost to Petra Martić. In February 2010 at the Abierto Mexicano Telcel, Fichman defeated her first top-50 player when she beat world No. 40, Sorana Cîrstea, in the first round. She also won two $100k doubles titles in July 2010 (in Biarritz and in Pétange).

2011–12
In January 2011, Sharon won her first tournament of the year, the $25k in Plantation, by defeating Alexandra Cadanțu in the final. At the Copa Colsanitas WTA tournament, she reached the second round but lost to Catalina Castaño, despite having two match points in the second set. In July, she won her second tournament of the year at the $50k event in Waterloo, where she defeated Julia Boserup.

In July 2012, Fichman won the $50k Cooper Challenger for the second straight year with a win over Julia Glushko in the championship match. She won in September the $25k in Mamaia, defeating Patricia Maria Ţig in the final.

2013

At the end of January, Fichman won the eighth singles title of her career at the $25k event in Port St. Lucie, with a victory over Tadeja Majerič. In August, she reached the final of the $100k Vancouver Open, but was defeated by Johanna Konta. She won the doubles title alongside Maryna Zanevska. A week later at the Rogers Cup, she reached the second round for the first time of her career in singles after defeating compatriot Stéphanie Dubois in her opening match. She also made it to the semifinals in doubles with fellow Canadian Gabriela Dabrowski, after an upset over first seeds Sara Errani and Roberta Vinci. They were eliminated by Jelena Janković and Katarina Srebotnik.

At the US Open, Fichman qualified for her first-ever Grand Slam main draw with a victory over Alexandra Panova. She lost to world No. 22, Sorana Cîrstea, in the first round. In September, Fichman made it to the Premier Mandatory main draw in Beijing with wins over Paula Ormaechea and Yaroslava Shvedova in first and last round of qualifying, respectively. In the main draw, she was eliminated by Galina Voskoboeva in the first round.

2014

At the first tournament of her season, the ASB Classic, Fichman qualified and upset world No. 22, Sorana Cîrstea, in the first round to record the second top-50 win of her career (she also beat Cîrstea in 2010). The same week, she won her first WTA doubles title alongside Maria Sanchez with a victory over Lucie Hradecká and Michaëlla Krajicek in the final. In February, at the $100k in Midland, Fichman scored her third top-50 win when she beat world No. 45 Urszula Radwańska to reach the semifinals. She was defeated by Ksenia Pervak in the next round. At the Abierto Mexicano Telcel in late February, Fichman upset world No. 39, Yvonne Meusburger, in her opening match to advance to the second round. She lost to Caroline Garcia in her next match.

At the beginning of March, she qualified for the Premier Mandatory Indian Wells Open and defeated Shahar Pe'er in the first round. She was eliminated by world No. 10, Sara Errani, in the second round. In May, Fichman reached her first singles final of the season at the $100k Open de Cagnes-sur-Mer, where she won the biggest tournament of her career so far with a victory over Timea Bacsinszky. At the French Open in May, Fichman earned direct entry in the main draw of a Grand Slam tournament for the first time, but was eliminated in the opening round by world No. 7, Jelena Janković, in three sets. At Wimbledon, Fichman was defeated by Timea Bacsinszky in the first round. At the US Open, her first tournament after having knee surgery at the end of July, she lost to world No. 5, Agnieszka Radwańska, in the opening round.

2015–16
In August 2015 at the Rogers Cup, Fichman reached the quarterfinals in doubles with compatriot Carol Zhao.

She played a match at the $100k event in Trnava in May 2016, losing in the qualifying second round to Ágnes Bukta, and was inactive for nearly two years thereafter, claiming injuries, mental fatigue and a growing interest in broadcasting and coaching made her decide to take a break from playing.

2018
In April 2018, Fichman returned to the pro circuit at age 27, playing in doubles at the $60k event in Indian Harbour Beach. She reached the quarterfinals with partner Jamie Loeb. Fichman credited her return to fiancé Dylan Moscovitch suffering an accident that cut off his chances of qualifying to the 2018 Winter Olympics, making her decide to take up tennis again and rise enough in the rankings to attend the 2020 Summer Olympics and bring Moscovitch along.

2021: First Grand Slam doubles quarterfinal and WTA 1000 title
In May 2021, Fichman won the first WTA 1000 and biggest title in her doubles career at the Italian Open, partnering with Mexican player Giuliana Olmos. In the final, they defeated the pair of Kristina Mladenović and Markéta Vondroušová who were making their debut playing together. They had entered the tournament as alternates and defeated top seeds Hsieh/Mertens and the Japanese fourth seeded duo Aoyama/Shibahara en route to the championship match. As a result she entered the top 40 in doubles for the first time in her career at No. 31.
In February, Fichman and Olmos also reached their first Grand Slam quarterfinal at the 2021 Australian Open. Fichman managed to qualify for the Olympic tennis tournament, partnering Gabriela Dabrowski, and the 2021 WTA Finals. She sat out of the 2022 WTA Tour to recover from 2021's injuries, in the meantime joining Sportsnet and its team of tennis commentators.

Style of play
Fichman is an aggressive counter puncher, and is known for her tenacity as well as her feistiness on the court.

Significant finals

WTA 1000 finals

Doubles: 1 title

WTA career finals

Doubles: 8 (4 titles, 4 runner-ups)

WTA 125 tournament finals

Doubles: 1 (runner–up)

ITF Circuit finals

Singles: 22 (9 titles, 13 runner–ups)

Doubles: 40 (21 titles, 19 runner–ups)

Junior Grand Slam finals

Doubles: 3 (2 titles, 1 runner-up)

Grand Slam performance timelines

Singles

Doubles

Record against top-50 players
Fichman's win–loss record (4–7, 36%) against players who were ranked world No. 50 or higher when played is as follows: Players who have been ranked world No. 1 are in boldface.
 Sorana Cîrstea 2–1
 Urszula Radwańska 1–0
 Yvonne Meusburger 1–0
 Agnieszka Radwańska 0–1
 Maria Kirilenko 0–1
 Bethanie Mattek-Sands 0–1
 Kiki Bertens 0–1
 Jelena Janković 0–2
* statistics as of March 7, 2016

See also
 List of select Jewish tennis players

Notes

References

External links

 
 
 
 

1990 births
Living people
Canadian female tennis players
Jewish Canadian sportspeople
Jewish tennis players
Canadian people of Romanian-Jewish descent
Israeli people of Romanian-Jewish descent
Maccabiah Games gold medalists for Canada
Maccabiah Games silver medalists for Canada
Maccabiah Games bronze medalists for Canada
Tennis players from Toronto
Australian Open (tennis) junior champions
French Open junior champions
Grand Slam (tennis) champions in girls' doubles
Maccabiah Games medalists in tennis
Competitors at the 2005 Maccabiah Games
Tennis players at the 2020 Summer Olympics
20th-century Canadian women
21st-century Canadian women